Dudi Sela was the defending champion, but he chose not to compete this year.

Lukáš Lacko won the title by defeating Sergiy Stakhovsky 6–2, 6–3 in the final.

Seeds

Draw

Finals

Top half

Bottom half

References
 Main Draw
 Qualifying Draw

2014 ATP Challenger Tour
2014 Singles